Mohammad Ajman Miah, MBE FRSA (born 28 March 1959), better known by his nick name Tommy Miah, is a Bangladeshi-born British chef, owner of the Raj Restaurant and founder of the International Indian Chef of the Year Competition. He is often recognised as the "Curry King" in Britain.

Early life
Miah was born in a village in South Sylhet subdivision, Chittagong Division, East Pakistan (now Bangladesh). He arrived at the age of 10 in Birmingham, England. He was interested in food and cooking due to which he began working in the catering industry. He began by starting his own small takeout restaurant at the age of 17.

Career
Miah established himself in Edinburgh and founded Raj Restaurant. In 1991, he founded the International Indian Chef of the Year Competition, to promote innovation and quality in Indian cooking, which attracts 5000 entrants from around the world. The competition also consists of an event to raise funds for the Sreepur Village Orphanage in Bangladesh.

He was chosen to head the first South Asian Association for Regional Cooperation Food Festival in Delhi. He was also selected by the Bangladesh Foreign Office to represent Bangladesh, cooking typical Bangladeshi staple dishes.

Miah has established the Tommy Miah Institute of Hospitality Management, which is an institution which trains Bangladeshis in the international hospitality industry. He also owns the Original Raj Hotel in Murrayfield and The Heritage Restaurant in Dhaka, Bangladesh.

Miah's achievements includes, delivering a curry lunch-box to 10 Downing Street for the then Prime Minister John Major's 50th birthday, producing the world's largest curry which was large enough to feed 10,000, promoting innovation and quality in Asian cuisine, developing dishes for high class manufacturers, writing cooking books, and he was the first to make Indian meals available on flights worldwide. He has sponsored for many charity groups both in Bangladesh and Britain, which includes, Cancer Research UK, Shishu Polli, Centre for the Rehabilitation of the Paralysed, and the ORBIS Flying Eye Hospital. Tommy Miah runs food hygiene classes for refugee camps in Bangladesh, and also sponsors foreign students to study in the UK.

Awards and recognition
In 2004, Miah was elected a fellow of Royal Society of Arts.

In 2017, Miah was appointed a Member of the Order of the British Empire (MBE) in the 2017 Birthday Honours for his services to the hospitality industry and charity.

References

External links

Tommy Miah on British Bangladeshi Who's Who

1959 births
Living people
British Muslims
Bangladeshi emigrants to Scotland
Bangladeshi emigrants to England
British chefs
Chefs of Indian cuisine
British restaurateurs
Bangladeshi businesspeople
People from Moulvibazar District
Members of the Order of the British Empire
Naturalised citizens of the United Kingdom